A number of steamships have been named Goodleigh, including:

, a British cargo ship in service 1928–37
, a British cargo ship torpedoed and sunk in 1940

Ship names